Angelo Battelli (28 March 1862 – 11 December 1916) was an Italian scientist, notable for having measured temperatures and heats of fusion of non-metallic substances, metallic conductivities and thermoelectric effects in magnetic metals, and the Thomson effect. He investigated osmotic pressures, surface tensions, and physical properties of carbon disulfide (CS2), water (H2O), and alcohols, especially their vapor pressures, critical points, and densities. He studied X-rays and cathode rays. He investigated the resistance of solenoids to high-frequency alternating currents.

Early life and education
Batelli was born in Macerata Feltria, a comune (municipality) in the Province of Pesaro e Urbino, in the Marche region of Italy.

He obtained his doctor of philosophy in 1884 from the University of Turin in Turin, the capital of the Piedmont region of Italy, under Andrea Naccari, his doctoral advisor.

Career

He was the doctoral advisor of physicist Luigi Puccianti.

In 1897 he founded the Italian Physical Society.

Death
Batelli died in Pisa, the capital city of the Province of Pisa, in the Tuscany region of Italy.

References
 Dizionario Biografico degli Italiani, Istituto della Enciclopedia Italiana, 1960–1991; vol. 7, pp. 237–238.
 Nuovo Cimento [6th Ser.] 1917, 13, pp. 6–65.
 Nuovo Antologia [6th Ser.] 1917, 189, pp. 205–210.
   R. Atti,  Accad. Sci. Torino 1916–1917, 52, pp. 263–265.
   R. Atti,  Inst. Veneto Sci [9th Ser.] 1916–1917, 1, pp. 57–59.
   R. Rendic, Accad. Lincei, Cl. Sci. Fis. Mat. Nat. [5th Ser.] 1917, 26, pp. 82–85.
  D. Gambioli, Angelo Battelli e la sua opera scientifica, Pergola, 1917.

External links
 "Battelli Angelo (1862 - 1916"), Battelli biography (undated) at "Paths of Physics" website hosted by University of Padua(?)

1862 births
1916 deaths
19th-century Italian physicists
People from the Province of Pesaro and Urbino
Academic staff of the University of Padua
Academic staff of the University of Pisa
University of Turin alumni
20th-century Italian physicists